Kreutzer may refer to:

People
Andrew L. Kreutzer (1863-1905), member of the Wisconsin State Senate
Conradin Kreutzer (1780-1849), German composer and conductor
Daniel Kreutzer (born 1979), German professional ice hockey forward
Frank Kreutzer, former Major League Baseball pitcher.
Idar Kreutzer (born 1962), a Norwegian CEO 
Joseph Kreutzer (1790-1840), German violinist, composer, and conductor
Léon Charles François Kreutzer (1817—1868), French music critic, music historian, and composer 
Leonid Kreutzer (1884-1953), German classical pianist.
Rodolphe Kreutzer (1766-1831), French violinist, teacher, conductor, and composer
Samuel Kreutzer (1894-1971), Australian rugby player
Volker Kreutzer, West German sprint canoer
William Kreutzer, Jr. (born 1969), American soldier infamous for assassinating his commander and opening fire on his fellow soldiers at Fort Bragg

Other uses
Kreutzer, a synonym for Kreuzer, a medieval silver coin and unit of currency in Southern Germany
Kreutzer Air Coach, an American-built light trimotor transport aircraft of the late 1920s
Kreutzer Etudes, a set of works for solo violin composed by Rodolphe Kreutzer around 1796

See also
Kreutz (disambiguation)
Kreutzer Sonata (disambiguation)
Kreuz (disambiguation)
Kreuzer (disambiguation)